The 1981 World Table Tennis Championships – Corbillon Cup (women's team) was the 29th edition of the women's team championship.

China won the gold medal defeating South Korea 3–0 in the final, North Korea won the bronze medal.

Medalists

Final tables

Group A

Group B

Semifinals

Third Place Play Off

Final

See also
List of World Table Tennis Championships medalists

References

-
1981 in women's table tennis